Flashing may refer to:

Technology
 Firmware#Flashing, overwriting an EEPROM module in a device
 BIOS flashing, overwriting a BIOS image
 Flashing (cinematography), a technique that desaturates the color so that one sees more in shadowed areas
 Flashing (weatherproofing), construction material used to prevent the passage of water around objects
 Flash evaporation, causing evaporation by lowering a fluid's pressure below its vapour pressure
 Flashing light, such as a light bulb or computer's cursor
 Flash (manufacturing), excess material attached to a moulded product which must usually be removed

Other
 Flashing (horse)
 Flashing, a 1981 album by Himiko Kikuchi
 Exhibitionism, sexual body exposure
 Indecent exposure, inappropriate public nudity
 Headlight flashing, to alert other drivers
 Facing (retail), moving shelved products to the front

See also
 Flash (disambiguation)